Carnage is a 2002 French drama film directed by Delphine Gleize. It was screened in the Un Certain Regard section at the 2002 Cannes Film Festival.

Cast
 Chiara Mastroianni as Carlotta
 Ángela Molina as Alicia
 Lio as Betty
 Lucia Sanchez as Jeanne
 Esther Gorintin as Rosie
 Marilyne Even as Lucie
 Clovis Cornillac as Alexis
 Jacques Gamblin as Jacques
 Féodor Atkine as Paco
 Juliette Noureddine as Monica
 Pascal Bongard as Henri
 Bernard Sens as Luc
 Raphaëlle Molinier as Winnie
 Julien Lescarret as Victor
 Pascal N'Zonzi as The Cow Man
 Luc Delhumeau as The Deaf Man

Critical response
On Rotten Tomatoes, the film holds an approval rating of 78%, based on 36 reviews, with an average rating of 6.9/10. On Metacritic the film has a score of 71 out of 100, based on 19 critics, indicating "generally favorable reviews".

Accolades

References

External links
 

2002 films
2002 drama films
2000s French-language films
2002 directorial debut films
French drama films
Films directed by Delphine Gleize
2000s French films